Mill Creek is a minor tributary of the Upper Mississippi River, essentially confined to Bellevue Township in Jackson County, Iowa, United States, entering the Big River just south of the city of Bellevue.

See also

 List of rivers of Iowa
 Potter's Mill

References

Tributaries of the Mississippi River
Bodies of water of Jackson County, Iowa
Rivers of Iowa